The teams competing in Group 5 of the 2011 UEFA European Under-21 Championships qualifying competition were Czech Republic, Germany, Iceland, Northern Ireland and San Marino.

Standings

Matches

Goalscorers
As of 3 September, there have been 85 goals scored over 18 games, for an average of 4.72 goals per game.

1 goal

References
UEFA.com

5
under
under
under
under